Serhiy Datsenko (born 6 September 1987) is a Ukrainian football midfielder.

Datsenko is a product of FC Obolon-Zmina Kyiv and FC Dynamo Kyiv Youth Sportive School systems. His first trainer was Heorhiy Navrazidi.

References

External links

 

1987 births
Living people
Footballers from Kyiv
Ukrainian footballers
Association football midfielders
Ukrainian expatriate footballers
Expatriate footballers in Moldova
Expatriate footballers in Belarus
Ukrainian expatriate sportspeople in Uzbekistan
FC Dynamo-3 Kyiv players
FC CSKA Kyiv players
FC Nafkom Brovary players
FC Zimbru Chișinău players
FC Feniks-Illichovets Kalinine players
FC Helios Kharkiv players
FK Dinamo Samarqand players
FC Poltava players
FK Andijon players
FC Torpedo-BelAZ Zhodino players
FC Obolon-Brovar Kyiv players
FC Dnepr Mogilev players
FC Arsenal Kyiv players